Maaroub (Arabic: معروب), is a small town  in the Tyre District of Southern Lebanon's South Governorate. It is characterized by a blend of old and new  architecture. The town is divided into two parts: the old town, and the modern one  that has recently arisen.

Name

According to E. H. Palmer, the name Marub comes from  abounding in water. It has been suggested that the name Maaroub means a "land of great abundance and goodness." It has been also suggested that it means that it is perfect land for agriculture where the agriculture of olive, tobacco, wheat and figs flourish.

Location
Maaroub is located in the South Governorate, Tyre District. It is 270 m above sea level and 88 kilometres to the south-west of Beirut, the capital city of Lebanon, or about an hour and a half, and 15 km from the center of its district Tyre. Its land area is 562 hectares. The number of its registered residents is 3600.

History
Maaroub is known for its historical monuments, one of those being Cave of Al-Saliha. The Cave of Al-Saliha is located in the middle of the village; specifically, in the old village. The aforementioned cave has the following story, according to local folklore: A pious woman had a shrine she would frequent. Whenever she appeared; a very beautiful scent would emanate. Thus, it is said that people would visit that place to light candles and pray. This cave dates back at least to Ottoman times.

In 1875, Victor Guérin noted it as "a small village called Ain Ma'roub. It owes its existence to a nearby spring, which flows into the wadi itself and waters  fig and pomegranate trees. The population of this village can be estimated at a hundred Metualis. It succeeded an ancient locality; for I see here and there several ashlars and a small Corinthian capital in white marble embedded in the wall of a private house, which, I was told, were found on the spot."

In 1881, the PEF's Survey of Western Palestine (SWP)  described it as: "Mud and stone village, containing about 200 Metawileh, built on the side of a hill, with figs and arable land around. Water from cisterns and a spring."

Building
Maaroub was filled with old houses. The method of construction was very different from our days. They used to slather dirt and mud in the form of a stone and it was called (Madlakeh), and they would rub the ground and put the turbid of olive oil (they used to get it from the winepress) and put pomegranate peels to harden more.

Notable people
Ahmad Chhadeh; a Lebanese music produce and founder and CEO of Arabsong Production
Muhammad Fneish; a Shia Lebanese politician and member of Hezbollah. 
Hussein Fneish (October 14, 1993-) is a Lebanese actor. He was born in Maaroub Tyre District. He participated in commercial advertisements, then moved to acting in 2016, where he participated in many works.

References

Bibliography

External links
 localiban
Survey of Western Palestine, Map 2:   IAA, Wikimedia commons

Populated places in Tyre District